Colorado is the 39th studio album by Canadian-American singer-songwriter Neil Young (and his first studio album with Crazy Horse since 2012), released on October 25, 2019, by Reprise Records. The album was preceded by the singles "Milky Way" (released on August 30, 2019) and "Rainbow of Colors" (released on September 12, 2019) and is dedicated to Elliot Roberts, Young's manager since 1967, who died aged 76 on June 21, 2019. It was also the first album to feature Nils Lofgren as a member of Crazy Horse since 1971.

Critical reception

Colorado received generally positive reviews from critics. At Metacritic, which assigns a normalized rating out of 100 to reviews from critics, the album received an average score of 79, which indicates "generally favorable reviews", based on 19 reviews.

Track listing
All tracks composed by Neil Young.

B-sides

Personnel
Neil Young – lead vocals, guitar, acoustic piano, vibes, harmonica, glass harmonica
Nils Lofgren – guitar, piano, pump organ, taps, vocals
Billy Talbot – bass, vocals
Ralph Molina – drums, vocals

Charts

References

2019 albums
Neil Young albums
Crazy Horse (band) albums
Albums produced by Neil Young
Albums produced by John Hanlon
Reprise Records albums